Los Hispanos was a Puerto-Rican vocal quartet active in 1960s New York City.

References

Puerto Rican musical groups
American vocal groups